Agustín Eugenio García Basso (born 26 March 1992) is an Argentine professional footballer who plays as a defender for Deportivo Cuenca in the Liga PRO Ecuador.

Career
García Basso began his career with Deportivo MacAllister, notably featuring in senior football in Liga Cultural de Fútbol, prior to signing for Boca Juniors. He was moved into Boca's first-team squad towards the end of the 2012–13 Argentine Primera División season, making his professional debut on 11 May 2013 during a 3–0 loss away to San Lorenzo. He appeared as an unused substitute in two further matches in 2012–13 as Boca Juniors finished nineteenth in the Torneo Final. In July 2013, García Basso was loaned to Douglas Haig of Primera B Nacional. Twenty-six appearances followed across the 2013–14 season.

Sportivo Belgrano completed the permanent signing of García Basso on 2 February 2015. He was subsequently selected in thirty fixtures. The 2016 Primera B Nacional campaign saw García Basso sign for Santamarina, with the defender scoring his first senior goal on his Santamarina debut on 30 January against Juventud Unida. On 5 August 2017, following sixty-four games for Santamarina, García Basso departed to join fellow Primera B Nacional team Agropecuario. He departed in June 2020.

Personal life
García Basso is the grandson of former professional footballer Oscar Basso.

Career statistics
.

References

External links

1992 births
Living people
Sportspeople from Buenos Aires Province
Argentine footballers
Association football defenders
Argentine Primera División players
Primera Nacional players
Boca Juniors footballers
Club Atlético Douglas Haig players
Sportivo Belgrano footballers
Club y Biblioteca Ramón Santamarina footballers
Club Agropecuario Argentino players